is a Japanese professional baseball player. He was born on July 21, 1988. He debuted in 2011. He had 9 strikeouts in 2013.

References

Living people
1988 births
Baseball people from Kagoshima Prefecture
Japanese baseball players
Nippon Professional Baseball pitchers
Hokkaido Nippon-Ham Fighters players